The Grimorium Verum (Latin for True Grimoire) is an 18th-century grimoire attributed to one "Alibeck the Egyptian" of Memphis, who purportedly wrote in 1517. Like many grimoires, it claims a tradition originating with King Solomon.

The grimoire is not a translation of an earlier work as purported, its original appearing in French or Italian in the mid-18th century, as noted already by A. E. Waite who discussed the work in his The Book of Ceremonial Magic (1911), stating:

One version of the Grimoire was included as The Clavicles of King Solomon: Book 3 in one of the French manuscripts S. L. MacGregor Mathers incorporated in his version of the Key of Solomon, but it was omitted from the Key with the following explanation:

Idries Shah also published some of it in The Secret Lore of Magic: Book of the Sorcerers in 1957.

Contents of the book

Book one
"Concerning the character of demons"
In particular the superior spirits of Lucifer, Beelzebub, Astaroth, including the many inferior spirits below them and their invoking sigils.

Book two
"Of planetary hours"

Book three
"The preparation of the operator"

Book four
"Here begins the Sanctum Regnum, called the royalty of spirits, or the Little Key of Solomon, a most learned Hebraic necromancer and Rabbi. This book contains various combinations of characters whereby the powers can be invoked or brought forth whensoever you may wish, each according to his faculty."

Editions
 Trident Books (1994, 2nd. ed. 1997) 
 Joseph H. Peterson (2007) 
Jake Stratton-Kent (2009). Scarlet Imprint. .
Tarl Warwick (2015). .

References

External links
Grimorium verum (partial) at Esoteric Archives

Verum
18th-century books